Romeo & Juminten  is an Indonesian soap opera produced by Mega Kreasi Films. The show first aired on SCTV on June 6, 2016.

Plot summary 
Atmo and Suryo promised each other that when their respective wives gave birth, they would betroth their children to each other. Suryo has a son and names him Romeo, while Atmo has a daughter and names her Juminten.  Romeo and Juminten grow up together in the village of Ngawi, where they spend their youth as friends, until one day Suryo receives a scholarship to a school in London. Being a devoted friend, Atmo volunteers to sell his land to help pay for Suryo and his family to make the move to London. The decision to go to London weighs heavily on Suryo, and he wonders if Romeo and Juminten will be given the chance to marry.

Cast 
 Naysila Mirdad — Juminten
 Jeff Smith — Romeo Suryo Wicaksono 
 Yadi Timo — Atmo
 Mieke Amalia — Retno
 Ponco Buwono — Suryo Wicaksono
 Andi Soraya — Menik
 Zacky Zimah — Sidik Japran 
 Jennifer Coppen — Cheryl Suryo Wicaksono
 Fauzan Nasrul — Damar
 Fadel Levy — Reyhan
 Krisjiana Baharudin — Ditto
 Andryan Bima — Little Romeo
 Denino — Yoris
 Andrea Dea — Sela
 Tania Hardjosubroto — Jamilah
 Nima Ata — Cici
 Stefani Nepa — Zahra
 Agesh Palmer — Anabel

Characters

References 

Indonesian television soap operas
2016 Indonesian television series debuts